Bradyll is an early steam locomotive built by Timothy Hackworth at his Soho Works in Shildon, England in 1840. She is the oldest surviving locomotive with an 0-6-0 wheel arrangement.

History

Bradyll was built to work on the South Hetton Railway, which ran from Haswell to Seaham Harbour. She was named after Colonel Thomas Bradyll, who owned the mines and promoted the railway and new port built at Seaham.

Survival

Bradyll was obsolete by the 1870s, and in 1875 she was converted into a snowplough. This was done by removing her cylinders and motion, and adding a blade and weights. By World War Two, she had been withdrawn from this duty, but escaped the scrap drive as she was on an isolated piece of track.

After the war, she was placed at the works gates to the Philadelphia Iron Works as a "gate guardian" and regularly painted with a tar-based paint, which helped to preserve her. This locomotive was kept in the 'Council yard' at Burke Street, Shildon during the early 70's prior to it being moved into the display sheds when they opened the Timothy Hackworth Museum. It was painted black at that time.
Bradyll has never been restored, and is probably unique in this respect. The locomotive has an Adamson type firebox, and Wilson wheels, as used by Hackworth on the Stockton & Darlington Railway.

Bradyll is currently on display at Locomotion, Shildon. She will be conserved, but no restoration will take place to return her to an "as built" appearance.

Is it Bradyll or not?

Recent research by Dr Michael Bailey has led him to conclude that the locomotive is probably not Bradyll, but Nelson, a locomotive built c1840 by Thomas Richardson of Hartlepool for the South Hetton Colliery. The December 1919 issue of the Locomotive Magazine states that the locomotive at the time bore plates identifying it as Nelson No.2.

References

0-6-0 locomotives
Individual locomotives of Great Britain
Early steam locomotives
Preserved steam locomotives of Great Britain